Black Cat is a 1991 Hong Kong action film directed and produced by Stephen Shin. The film stars Jade Leung as Catherine who accidentally kills a truck driver. After escaping trial, she is captured by medics who insert a "Black Cat" chip into her brain putting her under the complete control of the American CIA. The CIA makes her into a new CIA agent known as Erica.

Director Stephen Shin originally wanted the film to be a straight remake of Luc Besson's film La Femme Nikita but couldn't after Disney purchased the rights for an American remake. Critics compared the film unfavorably to La Femme Nikita. Jade Leung won the award for Best Newcomer at the 11th Hong Kong Film Awards for her role in the film. A sequel titled Black Cat 2: The Assassination of President Yeltsin was released in 1992.

Production
Director Stephen Shin originally wanted to make the film a straight remake of Luc Besson's film La Femme Nikita but stopped after rights to a remake in the United States were purchased by Disney. For the role of Catherine, unknown model Jade Leung was cast. Black Cat was filmed on locations in Hong Kong, Japan and Canada.

Release
The film was released in Hong Kong on 17 August 1991. The film grossed a total of HK$11,088,210. The film received a sequel in 1992 titled Black Cat 2: The Assassination of President Yeltsin.

Reception
Jade Leung won the award for best newcomer for her role in Black Cat at the 11th Hong Kong Film Awards. Stephen Holden of The New York Times praised an action scene in the film involving Jade Leung going down a tall building crane to arrange for some steel bars to fall onto a speeding car. Holden went on to critique the love story in the film referring to it as "the movie's weakest element" as Thomas Lam's character "is simply too bland and passive to make a scintillating partner for a dynamo like Catherine." Derek Elley in Variety referred to the film as a "thinly scripted" film and that Leung is "excellent in the bruising opening reels." The Los Angeles Times gave a mixed review referring to the film as "essentially routine, an all-too-obvious kickoff to a series that already has its third installment in production." Allrovi gave the film two stars out of five referring to the film as a "knock off of Luc Besson's La Femme Nikita"

See also

 Hong Kong films of 1991
 List of action films of the 1990s
 List of neo-noir titles

Notes

References
 *

External links
 

Hong Kong action thriller films
1991 action thriller films
1991 films
Films set in the United States
Films shot in Japan
Films shot in Vancouver
Films shot in Hong Kong
Girls with guns films
1990s Hong Kong films